Mauricio González is the name of:

 Mauricio González (footballer) (1942–2018), Salvadoran football player
 Mauricio González (runner) (born 1960), Mexican long-distance runner
 Mauricio González de la Garza (1923–1995), Mexican journalist, writer and music composer
 Mauricio González Sfeir (born 1956), Bolivian businessman